The 2010-11 V-League season was the 7th season of the V-League, the highest professional volleyball league in South Korea. The season started on 4 December 2010 and finished on 14 April 2011. Daejeon Samsung Bluefangs were the defending champions in the men's league and Daejeon KT&G the defending female champions.

Teams

Men's clubs

Women's clubs

Regular season

League table (Male)

League table (Female)

Play-offs

Bracket (Male)

Bracket (Female)

Top Scorers

Men's

Women's

Player of the Round

Men's

Women's

Final standing

Men's League

Women's League

References

External links
 Official website 

2010 in volleyball
2011 in volleyball
V-League (South Korea)